Studley Priory may refer to:

Studley Priory, Oxfordshire
Studley Priory, Warwickshire

See also
Studley (disambiguation)
Priory (disambiguation)